Kings Monkton School, formerly Monkton House, is a private day school for boys and girls aged 3–18.  It is located in Roath, Cardiff near the city's Mansion House and Cardiff University.

The school was founded in 1870 and more recently has been owned by CfBT Education Trust and since April 2013 by Heathfield Independent Schools. The school was then bought out and turned into an independent limited company by the principal in 2018/19.

Notable alumni
Ray Milland (1907–1986), Oscar-winning film actor
Thomas Dalton-Morgan (1917–2004), fighter pilot and flying ace
Terry Nation (1930–1997), television screenwriter, creator of the Daleks.

References 

Private schools in Cardiff